According to Sarira Traya, the Doctrine of the Three bodies in Hinduism, the human being is composed of three shariras or "bodies" emanating from Brahman by avidya, "ignorance" or "nescience". They are often equated with the five koshas (sheaths), which cover the atman. The Three Bodies Doctrine is an essential doctrine in Indian philosophy and religion, especially Yoga, Advaita Vedanta, Tantra and Shaivism.

The Three Bodies

Karana sarira – causal body

Karana sarira or the causal body is merely the cause or seed of the subtle body and the gross body. It has no other function than being the seed of the subtle and the gross body. It is nirvikalpa rupam, "undifferentiated form". It originates with avidya, "ignorance" or "nescience" of the real identity of the atman, instead giving birth to the notion of jiva.

Swami Sivananda characterizes the causal body as "The beginningless ignorance that is indescribable". Siddharameshwar Maharaj, the guru of Nisargadatta Maharaj, also describes the causal body as characterized by "emptiness", "ignorance", and "darkness". In the search for the "I am", this is a state where there is nothing to hold on to anymore.

Ramanuja concludes that it is at this stage that consummation of the atman with the Paramatman is reached and the search for the highest Purusa, i.e., of Ishvara, ends.

According to other philosophical schools, the causal body is not the atman, because it also has a beginning and an end and is subject to modification. Shankara, not seeking a personal god, goes beyond Anandamaya Kosha in search of the transcendent Brahman.

The Indian tradition identifies it with the Anandamaya kosha, and the deep sleep state, where buddhi becomes dormant and all concepts of time fail, although there are differences between these three descriptions.

The causal body is considered as the most complex of the three bodies. It contains the impressions of experience, which results from past experience.

Sukshma sarira – subtle body

Sukshma sarira or the subtle body is the body of the mind and the vital energies, which keep the physical body alive. Together with the causal body it is the transmigrating soul or jiva, separating from the gross body upon death.

The subtle body is composed of the five subtle elements, the elements before they have undergone panchikarana, and contains:
 sravanadipanchakam – the five organs of perception: eyes, ears, skin, tongue and nose
 vagadipanchakam – the five organs of action: speech, hands, legs, anus and genitals
 pranapanchakam – the five-fold vital breath: Prana (respiration), Apana (evacuation of waste from the body),  Vyana (blood circulation), Udana (actions like sneezing, crying, vomiting etc.), Samana (digestion) 
 Manas
 Buddhi, the Intellect, discriminating wisdom

Other Indian traditions see the subtle body as an eighth-fold aggregate, placing together the mind-aspects and adding avidyā, kama, and karma:
 buddhyadicatustayam (buddhi, manas, citta, ahamkara), 
 avidya (adhyasa, super-imposition), 
 kama (desire), 
 karma (action of the nature of dharma and adharma).

In samkhya, which does not acknowledge a causal body, it is also known as the linga-sarira. It puts one in the mind of the atman, it reminds one of the atman, the controller. It is the beginningless limitation of the atman, it has no beginning like the sthula sarira.

The "dream state" is a distinct state of the subtle body, where the buddhi shines itself owing to memory of deeds done in the waking state. It is the indispensable operative cause of all the activities of the individual self.

Sthula sarira – gross body

Sthula sarira or the gross body is the material physical mortal body that eats, breathes and moves (acts). It is composed of many diverse components, produced by one's karmas (actions) in past life out of the elements which have undergone panchikarana i.e. combining of the five primordial subtle elements.

It is the instrument of the jiva's experience, which, attached to the body and dominated by ahamkara, uses the body's external and internal organs of sense and action. The Jiva, identifying itself with the body, in its waking state enjoys gross objects. On its body rests man's contact with the external world.

The sthula sariras main features are sambhava (birth), jara (old age or ageing) and maranam (death), and the "waking state". The sthula sarira is the anatman.

Correlations with other models

Three bodies and five sheaths

The Taittiriya Upanishad describes five koshas, which are also often equated with the three bodies. The three bodies are often equated with the five koshas (sheaths), which cover the Atman:
 , the Gross body, also called the Annamaya Kosha
 , the Subtle body, composed of:
 Pranamaya Kosha (Vital breath or Energy), 
 Manomaya Kosha (Mind),
 Vijnanamaya Kosha (Intellect) 
 , the Causal body, the Anandamaya Kosha (Bliss)

Four states of consciousness and turiya
The Mandukya Upanishad describes four states of consciousness, first is called vaishvanara (waking consciousness), second is taijasa (dreaming state), third is prajna (deep sleep state) and fourth is turiya (the superconsciousness state). Waking state, dreaming state, and deep sleep state are equated with the three bodies. while turiya (the superconsciousness state) is a fourth state, which is equated with atman and Purusha.

Turiya

Turiya, pure consciousness or  superconsciousness, is the fourth state. It is the background that underlies and transcends the three common states of consciousness. 
 In this consciousness both absolute and relative, Saguna Brahman and Nirguna Brahman, are transcended. It is the true state of experience of the infinite (ananta) and non-different (advaita/abheda), free from the dualistic experience which results from the attempts to conceptualise ( vipalka) reality. It is the state in which ajativada, non-origination, is apprehended.

Four bodies
Siddharameshwar Maharaj, the guru of Nisargadatta Maharaj, discerns four bodies, by including Turiya or the "Great-Causal Body"  as a fourth body. Here resides the knowledge of "I am" that cannot be described, the state before Ignorance and Knowledge, or Turiya state

Integral Theory
The three bodies are a critical component of  Ken Wilber's Integral Theory.

Ten bodies of Kundalini Yoga
Kundalini Yoga as taught by Yogi Bhajan describes ten spiritual bodies: the physical body, three mental bodies and six energy bodies.  There is an 11th embodiment of Parallel Unisonness, which represents the divine sound current and is characterized by a pure state of non-dual consciousness.
First Body (Soul Body) – the spark of the infinite at the core
Second Body (Negative Mind) – the protective and defensive aspect of mind
Third Body (Positive Mind) – energetic and hopeful projection of mind
Fourth Body (Neutral Mind) – intuitive, integrates information from the negative and positive minds
Fifth Body (Physical Body) – the human vehicle on Earth
Sixth Body (Arcline) – extends from ear to ear, across the hairline and brow.  Commonly known as a halo.  Woman have a second arcline across the chest.  The arcline contains energy imprints of memories.
Seventh Body (Aura) – an electromagnetic field that surrounds the body; the container of a person's life force.
Eighth Body (Pranic Body) – connected with the breath, brings the life force and energy in and out of your system.
Ninth Body (Subtle Body) – gives the subtle perceptual ability to sense the infinite within the physical and material plane.
Tenth Body (Radiant Body) – gives spiritual royalty and radiance.

In Indian philosophy

Yoga physiology
The three bodies are an essential part of the Yoga physiology. Yoga aims at controlling the vital energies of the bodies, thereby attaining siddhis (magical powers) and moksha.

Atman vijnana

According to the Advaita Vedanta tradition, knowledge of the "self" or atman can be gained by self-inquiry, investigating the three bodies, and dis-identifying from them. It is a method which is well-known from Ramana Maharshi, but also from  Nisargadatta Maharaj and his teacher Siddharameshwar Maharaj.

By subsequently identifying with the three lower bodies, investigating them, and discarding identification with them when it has become clear that they are not the "I", the sense of "I am" beyond knowledge and Ignorance becomes clearly established.

In this investigation the three bodies are recognized as not being anatman.

In modern culture

Theosophy

The later Theosophists speak of seven bodies or levels of existence that include Sthula sarira and Linga sarira.

Yogananda

The guru Paramahansa Yogananda spoke of three bodies in his 1946 Autobiography of a Yogi.

See also

Hinduism
 Mandukya Upanishad
 Kosha
 Chakra
 Kundalini
 Yoga
 Advaita Vedanta
Buddhism
 Namarupa
 Skandha
 Trikaya

Notes

References

Sources

Published sources

Web-references

External links
 Advaita Yoga Ashram, Kundalini Yoga
 Reaswaran, An Overview of Vedanta Part 1, Yoga Forums

Vedanta
Nondualism
Advaita Vedanta